Dharampal Satyapal Group (DS Group) is a global conglomerate company founded in 1929 in Chandni Chowk, New Delhi by Lala Dharampal Sugandhi. Dharampal's son, Satyapal, took over the company after his father. The company is named after the father-son duo.The company has a turnover of over Rs 6500 crore. Dharampal Satyapal Limited (DSL) is the flagship company of the Dharampal Satyapal Group. The company has a diversified presence across various industries such as FMCG, Food and Beverage, Mouth Fresheners, Confectionery, Tobacco, Luxury Retail, Packaging, Infrastructure, Rubber Thread, and Agribusiness.

Products 
DS Group has diversified into various sectors such as FMCG, hospitality and infrastructure.

 Pulse (confectionery), which equalled Coke Zero's sales record of over Rs 100 crore in eight months of its release. 
 They also produce the widely selling brand "Catch Spices". Released in 1989, Catch Salt and Pepper are leaders in their segments. Catch products are sold through a network of over 200,000 outlets. 
 DS Group is also the producer of India's leading pan masala mouth freshener brand, Rajnigandha. 
 Tom Ford (brand) is marketed and franchised in India by the DS Group.
 DS Group is also the producer of Rajasthan's Leading Dairy Brand Ksheer.

References 

Conglomerate companies of India